Samson can be either a masculine given name or a surname. It may refer to:

Given name
 Samson, the man of extraordinary strength in the Book of Judges in the Bible
 Samson of Dol (c. 485–c. 565), British saint
 Samson of Brechin (fl. 1150–1165), first known Bishop of Brechin, Scotland
 Samson of Tottington (1135–1211), English Benedictine monk and Abbot of Bury St. Edmunds
 Samson (bishop of Worcester) (died 1112), chaplain to William the Conqueror, later Bishop of Worcester
 Samson Abramsky (born 1953), British computer scientist
 Samson Felix Amarasinghe, Sri Lankan Sinhala civil servant
 Samson Ebukam (born 1995), American football player
 Samson Gombe (1938–1989), Kenyan scientist and professor
 Samson Johnson, Togolese basketball player
 Samson Kandie (born 1971), Kenyan long-distance runner
 Samson Kitur (1966–2003), Kenyan middle-distance runner
 Samson Lee (b. 1992), Welsh international rugby union player
 Samson Makintsev (1776–1849), Russian-Iranian general
 Samson Mwita Marwa (1932–2022), Kenyan member of parliament
 Samson Rausuk (1793–1877), Lithuanian-British librarian and poet
 Samson Tam (born 1964), elected member of the Legislative Council of Hong Kong

Surname
 Charles Rumney Samson (1883–1931), British air commodore and naval aviation pioneer
 Craig Samson (born 1984), Scottish footballer
 David Samson (rabbi) (born 1956), Orthodox rabbi
 David Samson (baseball) (born 1968), former Miami Marlins president; contestant on Survivor: Cagayan
 Edmé Samson (1810–1891), French possible forger of porcelain and pottery
 Elisabeth Samson (1715–1771), Surinamese coffee plantation owner
 Jérôme Samson (born 1987), Canadian National Hockey League player for the Carolina Hurricanes
 Joseph Samson (1888–1957), composer
 Leona D. Samson (born 1952), American biochemist
 Louis Samson (born 1995), German footballer
 Michel Samson (born 1972), Canadian politician
 Paul Samson (1953–2002), British heavy metal guitarist
 Polly Samson (born 1962), British novelist, songwriter and journalist
 Sanju Samson (born 1994), Indian cricketer
 Savanna Samson, stage name of American pornographic actress Natalie Oliveros (born 1967)
 Stéphane Samson (born 1975), French footballer
 Leela Samson (born 1951), Indian Bharatanatyam dancer

Patronymic
 Sanju Samson (born 1994), Indian cricketer

See also
 Sampson (given name)
 Sampson (surname)

English masculine given names
Masculine given names